Esporte Clube XV de Novembro, more commonly referred to as XV de Jaú, is a Brazilian football club based in Jaú, São Paulo. The team compete in Campeonato Paulista Segunda Divisão, the fourth tier of the São Paulo state football league.

The club is also known as Galo da Comarca, roughly meaning "County's Rooster".

History
On November 15, 1924, the club was founded as Esporte Clube XV de Novembro de Jaú by José Piragine Sobrinho, Hermínio Cappabianca and other sportsmen.

In 1951, XV de Jaú won the Campeonato Paulista Second Level, beating  Linense of Lins in the final. The club then played the relegation/promotion play-off against Jabaquara, which was the last placed team of Campeonato Paulista First Level. XV de Jaú won the first leg, but was defeated in the second leg. In the third match against Jabaquara, the club beat its opponent and was promoted to the following year's Campeonato Paulista First Level.

In 1976, for the second time, the Campeonato Paulista Second Level was won by the club.

In 1979, the club competed for the first time in the top level of the Brazilian Championship, finishing in the 56th place.

Three years later, in 1982, XV de Jaú competed again in the Brazilian football's top level league, finishing this time in the 20th position, ahead of clubs such as Internacional, Cruzeiro and Atlético Paranaense.

In 1988, the club competed in the third level of the Brazilian Championship, but was eliminated in the first stage of the competition, finishing in the last place of its group.

Achievements
Campeonato Paulista Second Level
Champions (2): 1951, 1976
Campeonato Paulista Sub-20
First Place: 2005

Stadium
XV de Jaú's home stadium is Estádio Zezinho Magalhães, inaugurated in 1973, with a maximum capacity of 13,040 people. The stadium is nicknamed Jauzão, meaning Big Jaú.

References

External links
 Official site 
 Esporte Clube XV de Novembro (Jaú)'s fansite 

 
Association football clubs established in 1924
Football clubs in São Paulo (state)
1924 establishments in Brazil